The Cole House near Paris, Idaho was listed on the National Register of Historic Places in 1982.

It was deemed "architecturally significant as the only building in Paris, besides the Tabernacle, to exhibit local stone masonry and as one of two mansard-roofed houses, of the six nominated in Paris, to remain essentially unaltered."

References

Houses on the National Register of Historic Places in Idaho
Second Empire architecture in Idaho
Bear Lake County, Idaho